Urpek is a village in Amangeldi District of Kostanay Region, northern Kazakhstan.

Geoglyph

References

Populated places in Kostanay Region
Neolithic sites
Megalithic monuments
Archaeological sites in Kazakhstan